Frances Anne Vane, Marchioness of Londonderry (17 January 1800 – 20 January 1865) was a wealthy English heiress and noblewoman. She was the daughter of Sir Henry Vane-Tempest, 2nd Baronet. She married Charles William Stewart, 1st Baron Stewart. She became a marchioness in 1822 when Charles succeeded his half-brother as 3rd Marquess of Londonderry.

Life
Frances Anne was the only child of Sir Henry Vane-Tempest, 2nd Baronet, and his wife Anne MacDonnell, 2nd Countess of Antrim. At her father's death in 1813, Frances Anne inherited extensive lands in northeast England as well as some property in County Antrim, Ireland. As much of her English land was in the Durham Coalfield, she had income from coal mining. In his last will and testament, her father had stipulated that she must retain the surname Vane and that whoever married her would have to adopt her surname in lieu of his own.

In 1819 she married and became the second wife of Charles William Stewart, 1st Baron Stewart, who dutifully changed his name and became Charles William Vane. In 1822 she became a marchioness when her husband succeeded his half-brother Lord Castlereagh to become the 3rd Marquess of Londonderry. With her husband, she developed an extensive coal mining operation that included coal mines, a railway, and docks at Seaham.

She became an object of affection for Tsar Alexander I after he happened to see her engagement portrait by Sir Thomas Lawrence.

She sought to promote the political career of her eldest son, George Vane-Tempest, and was a patron of Benjamin Disraeli.

She built Garron Tower north of Carnlough, County Antrim, as a summer residence for herself.

When her husband died in 1854, she commissioned an equestrian statue showing him as a hussar, which was unveiled in 1861 and still stands on the market place in Durham, England. The sculptor was Raffaelle Monti.

Through her daughter, Lady Frances Vane, wife of John Churchill, 7th Duke of Marlborough, she is the great-grandmother of Sir Winston Churchill.

Issue

George Henry Robert Charles William Vane-Tempest, 5th Marquess of Londonderry (1821–1884)
Lady Frances Anne Emily Vane (1822–1899); married John Spencer-Churchill, 7th Duke of Marlborough.
Lady Alexandrina Octavia Maria Vane (1823–1874), godchild of Alexander I of Russia; married Henry Dawson-Damer, 3rd Earl of Portarlington.
Lord Adolphus Frederick Charles William Vane-Tempest (1825–1864), politician; became insane, and had to be medically restrained.
Lady Adelaide Emelina Caroline Vane (c.1830–1882); disgraced the family by eloping with her brother's tutor, Rev. Frederick Henry Law.
Lord Ernest McDonnell Vane-Tempest (1836–1885), fell in with a press-gang and had to be bought a commission in the army, from which he was subsequently cashiered.

Frederick William Robert Stewart, 4th Marquess of Londonderry (1805–1872) was her stepson.

Ancestry

References

Bibliography

Jeremiah William Summers, The History and Antiquities of Sunderland (J. Tate), 1858
K. D. Reynolds, Vane, Frances Anne, marchioness of Londonderry (1800–1865), Oxford Dictionary of National Biography, Oxford University Press, September 2004; online edition, January 2008. Retrieved 29 August 2008
Diane Urquhart, The Ladies of Londonderry: Women and Political Patronage (I. B. Tauris), 2007 
Purchasing Power of British Pounds from 1264 to 2007. Retrieved 29 August 2008

External links
 

1800 births
1865 deaths
Irish marchionesses
Daughters of Irish earls
Daughters of baronets
Frances Anne
Frances Anne
Wives of knights